Hilo High School is a public, co-educational high school of the Hawaii State Department of Education, and serves grades nine through twelve.  Established in 1906, its first class graduated in 1909.  Hilo High School is near the Wailuku River in Hawaii County on the Big Island of Hawaii, United States.  The campus boasts the black marble terrazzo and gray gravel sculpture Matrix by Ken Shutt in the middle of its two patios in its courtyard.  The school is situated at 556 Waianuenue Avenue on across the street from Hilo Intermediate School, one of its two feeder schools, the other being Kalanianaole Intermediate School.  Hilo's symbol and mascot is the Viking and its school colors are blue and gold. Hilo High School celebrated its centennial during Homecoming of 2006. Hilo High School's crosstown rivals are the Warriors of Waiakea High School.

History
Hilo High School was started by the school authorities in September 1905. The idea for a high school is attributed to Josephine Deyo, principal of Hilo Union School. The weak public interest eventually grew stronger as the public realized the benefits from a high school in Hilo, Hawaii. At the time, the only High Schools on the island were Kau High and Pahala Elementary School and Honokaa High & Intermediate School, both over 30 miles away in rural sugar communities that were disconnected from most of the island and were only accessible by railroad. Most students who wished to attend high school went to boarding school in Honolulu, Hawaii.

The school changed location in 1907 to the District Annex location and was then named Hilo Junior High School, and moved yet again in 1922 to its present location on Waianuenue Avenue.

Timeline of the 556 Waianuenue Ave. campus
1922- First Building- Makai Building
1926- Miss Margaret Way's music class created the Hilo High Alma mater
1927- Auditorium Building donated by the Alumni Association.
1931 and 1934-Cafeteria built (Now known as F building)
1935- First stage of the Mauka Building built
1936- Second stage of the Mauka Building built
1939- Third stage of the Mauka Building built
1937- Original gym and wood shop built
1961- Administration Building Built
1962- Swimming Pool donated by Mrs. John M Ross and Mrs. Isabel Kennedy
1963- The Library and Multi Purpose Room was built
1968- The Cafeteria was built
1970- R-Building
1977- Mauka Building burns down
1979- 100-car parking lot built
1980- C Building built
2014- New Gym built at the old annex location.

Hilo High School Foundation
The Hilo High School Foundation was formed in 1990, with the purpose of creating and maintaining an endowment fund that would fund educational programs and activities at Hilo High School that would not or could not be funded from State of Hawaii funds.  It annually provides the school with the interest earnings for distribution to programs. A committee designated by the Principal solicits and reviews proposals from faculty for new and innovative programs that benefit the educational experience of Hilo High School students.

To date, the Foundation has distributed a total of over $130,000 to Hilo High School.  Its 2005 Financial Report place its assets at $724,063.44.

Class mascot and colors

Class of 2025: Jaguars, White and Gold
Class of 2024: Phoenix, Black and Blue
Class of 2023: Wolves, Black and Red
Class of 2022: Dragons, Black and White
Class of 2021: Panthers, White and Gold
Class of 2020: Lions, Black and Gold
Class of 2019: Wolves, Black and Silver 
Class of 2018: Honus, Teal and White
Class of 2017: Dragons, Black and Red
Class of 2016: Sharks, Black and White
Class of 2015: Wolves, Blue and Gold
Class of 2014: Pink Panthers, Black and Pink
Class of 2013: Tigers, Black and Red
Class of 2012: Dragons, Black and Blue
Class of 2011: Phoenix, Black and Green
Class of 2010: Panthers, Black and Gold
Class of 2009: Sharks, Black and Red
Class of 2008: Tigers, Black and Silver
Class of 2007: Dragons, Blue and Silver
Class of 2006: Panthers, Black and White
Class of 2005: Honu, Black and Green
Class of 2004: Tigers
Class of 2003: Dragons, Black and Red
Class of 2002: Monkeys, Blue and Silver
Class of 2001: Elmo, Black and White
Class of 2000: Honu, Black and Green
Class of 1972: Super Chicken, Red, White and Blue
Class of 1971: Pink Panthers, Pink and Purple

Commencement
Hilo High School's commencement exercises are normally held during the end of May.

Hilo High school has several commencement traditions that stretch back to the school's first graduation in 1909.  The graduating class recites a variation of Gaudeamus Igitur with lyrics directly referencing Hilo High, and members of the Hilo High School Alumni Association pass out a lei to every graduate.  This latter tradition is attributed to the patriarch of the Tong family, who was among the school's first graduates and supposedly gave a lei to a fellow graduate who was without one during their commencement ceremony.  The Tong family also awarded the school's Salutatorian award and trophy with a cash prize until 2003, when the Salutatorian returned the cash prize out of respect for the family's disagreement with the school's current practice of awarding the Valedictorian distinction to more than one student.  The Valedictorian trophy is maintained by the Hilo High School Foundation.

Now, with the introduction of AP classes to Hilo High, it is possible for more than one student to become a valedictorian within the same graduating class since AP classes allow the student to get over a 4.0. The current requirements for becoming a valedictorian include getting the distinguished BOE diploma as well as getting a weighted GPA of at least 4.0.

Clubs
Hilo High supports an array of clubs that promotes and supports the talents, knowledge, ambitions and abilities of the students.  The clubs also train and prepare students for future professional careers, and allows the school and students to give back to the community through community service events.

DECA
Key Club
KVIKS Media
Leo Club
Math League
Performing Arts Learning Center (PALC)
Robotics

Notable alumni

 James Kealoha (1926), first lieutenant governor of Hawaii
 Pat Saiki (1948), United States Congresswoman
 Yoshi Oyakawa (1951), Olympic swimming gold medalist in the 1952 Summer Olympics
 Gil Kahele (1960), American politician and Democratic member of the Hawaii Senate
 Robert Kiyosaki (1965), author of Rich Dad, Poor Dad
 Jennifer Doudna (1981), American biochemist, developer of the CRISPR-Cas9 genome editing method, 2020 Nobel laureate
 Lorraine Inouye, Hawaii County Mayor and State Senator
 Lois-Ann Yamanaka (1979), author 
 BJ Penn (1995), retired MMA Fighter  former UFC Lightweight and Welterweight Champion and UFC Hall of Fame Member

Gallery

References

External links

Hilo High School Foundation
Hilo High Robotics Official Website

Educational institutions established in 1906
Schools in Hawaii County, Hawaii
Public high schools in Hawaii
Buildings and structures in Hilo, Hawaii
1906 establishments in Hawaii
Hawaii Register of Historic Places in Hawaii County, Hawaii